Black Marketing is an American 1943 dramatic propaganda documentary short produced by the United States Office of War Information and directed by William Castle. It is an educational film warning American civilians against buying unrationed foodstuffs and materials.

Synopsis 
The film opens in a courtroom with the prosecutor laying the government's case against a syndicate of racketeers with names like Joseph B, Sam E, etc. Once the prosecutor starts to go into the time line of the case, the film dissolves into short segments showing the racketeers at work, how they organized themselves, bought up steers at inflated prices and forced butchers to distribute the illicit beef. They are caught, however, when one housewife is told that she can't buy a steak with her ration cards, but a woman after her does without them.

The butcher is taken by the OPA (Office of Price Administration) and interrogated. He is asked what his son in Africa would think if he knew his father were cavorting with saboteurs, and spills the beans about his accomplices. When the lawyer comes back, he looks to the audience and tells them that they too must not buy goods above the rationed price, and report it if they see it. A closing note tells the audience that everyone in the film is a law-abiding citizen who volunteered to act in the movie to educate the public about black marketing.

See also
List of Allied propaganda films of World War II
United States home front during World War II

External links 
 
 

1943 short films
American World War II propaganda shorts
Films directed by William Castle
American black-and-white films
1943 documentary films
American short documentary films
RKO Pictures short films
1940s English-language films
1940s American films